Mount Chitina is an 8,424-foot (2,568-meter) mountain summit located in the Saint Elias Mountains of Wrangell-St. Elias National Park and Preserve, in the U.S. state of Alaska. Precipitation runoff from the mountain drains into the Chitina River, which in turn is part of the Copper River drainage basin. The first ascent of the peak was made September 24, 1988, by Danny Kost and Donnie Hunton via the west ridge. The mountain's name is derived from the Chitina Glacier located at the base of the north slope, and was first published on a Canadian topographic map in 1958.

Climate

Based on the Köppen climate classification, Mount Chitina is located in a subarctic climate zone with long, cold, snowy winters, and cool summers. Weather systems coming off the Gulf of Alaska are forced upwards by the Saint Elias Mountains (orographic lift), causing heavy precipitation in the form of rainfall and snowfall. Temperatures can drop below −20 °C with wind chill factors below −30 °C. The months May through June offer the most favorable weather for viewing and climbing.

See also

List of mountain peaks of Alaska
Geography of Alaska

References

External links
 Weather forecast: Mount Chitina

Landforms of Copper River Census Area, Alaska
Mountains of Alaska
Wrangell–St. Elias National Park and Preserve
North American 2000 m summits